Shrigonda Assembly constituency is one of the 288 Vidhan Sabha (legislative assembly) constituencies of Maharashtra state, western India. This constituency is located in Ahmednagar district.

Geographical scope
The constituency comprises Shrigonda taluka and Chichondi, Walki revenue circles of Ahmednagar taluka.

Representatives
 2014: Rahul Kundalikrao Jagtap, of the Nationalist Congress Party (NCP).

References

Assembly constituencies of Maharashtra
Ahmednagar district